Current Opinion is a series of medical journals published by Current Drugs from 1998 to 2010. Current Drugs was acquired by Thomson Corporation in 2004.

Journals in the series included:
Current Opinion in Drug Discovery & Development
Current Opinion in Investigational Drugs, established in 1992 continued as Expert Opinion on Investigational Drugs in 1994
Current Opinion in Investigational Drugs, established in 2000, formed by the merger of 
Current Opinion in Anti-infective Investigational Drugs
Current Opinion in Anti-inflammatory & Immunomodulatry Investigation Drugs
Current Opinion in Cardiovascular, Pulmonary and Renal Investigational Drugs
Current Opinion in Central & Peripheral Nervous System Investigational Drugs
Current Opinion in Oncologic, Endocrine & Metabolic Investigational Drugs
Current Opinion in Molecular Therapeutics

References

Academic journal series